iResQ is a DBA of ResQ Systems, LLC, an Internet-based company founded in 1994 and  located in Olathe, Kansas.  iResQ diagnoses and repairs Apple products and the Sony PSP.  iResQ also sells accessories and parts in addition to its repair and upgrade services.

Services
The company provides diagnostic and repair services for iPods, iPhones, iPads, MacBooks/MacBook Pros, Mac Minis, and PSPs. Battery recycling services are also available, and the company is an official rechargeable battery collection site in the Rechargeable Battery Recycling Corporation’s Call2Recycle  program.  iResQ also buys used or broken iPods, iPhones, Mac portables, and Mac desktops for parts and refurbishing .

In 2008 the company was named an Apple-authorized service provider which allows iResQ to diagnose problems and perform repairs for customers under Apple’s warranty program.  Today, iResQ is no longer an Apple-authorized service provider and does not accept Apple Warranties.

In February 2009, iResQ announced that it was partnering with a local recycling facility that redistributes surplus electronics to nonprofit organizations.  It will also have its cardboard and paper waste processed.

Previous names
The company was originally named “MacWorks” in 1994 and changed to ResQ Systems, LLC in 2001.  By 2007, the names “iPodResQ,” “PowerBookResQ,” “InkResQ,” “PowerMacResQ,” and “MacBookResQ” were used for different divisions.  In February 2007 the company announced the new name—iResQ—encompassing the various repair services under one brand.

The Dead iPod Song
iResQ attracted some attention after sponsoring a video created by the Internet-based comedians and filmmakers Rhett and Link.  The idea originated out of a contest when a fan responded to the website’s “Submit-a-Song” program by asking the duo to produce a video about what to do with a dead iPod.  The song was released in February 2008.  Featuring a cameo by viral video comedian iJustine, it has received over 2 million views on YouTube as of April 2018.

Notes

Other references
 Levine, Greg (2007-04-16).  "iPod, Heal Thyself", Salt Lake Tribune via The Columbus Dispatch.  Retrieved on 19 January 2009.
 Wayner, Peter (2007-11-08).  "Don't Throw Out Your Broken iPod; Fix It via the Web", New York Times. Retrieved on 19 January 2009.
 Gwinn, Eric (2008-01-15).  "What to Do with your Old Gadgets", Chicago Tribune. Retrieved on 19 January 2009.
 Russell, J. (2009-07-30).  "iResQ to the Rescue!", "iPhone Overload."  Retrieved on 20 August 2009.
 iResQ Better Business Bureau Reliability Report Retrieved on 3 September 2009.
 Passy, Charles (2009-12-03).  "Can Big-Box Merchants Fix Your Computer?", The Wall Street Journal.  Retrieved on 14 December 2009.
 Wortham, Jenna (2010-04-14).  "How to Fix Your iPhone (the Unofficial Edition)", The New York Times.  Retrieved on 15 April 2010
 Hickey, Matt (2010-12-21).  "Forget DIY repair. Sometimes, you need the pros", CNet.  Retrieved on 21 December 2010

External links
 
 iResQ's YouTube channel
 

Companies based in Kansas
Companies based in the Kansas City metropolitan area
American companies established in 1994